CKCM is an AM radio station in Grand Falls-Windsor, Newfoundland and Labrador, Canada, broadcasting at 620 kHz. Owned by Stingray Group, CKCM first went on the air in 1962. It is an affiliate of VOCM. CKCM has a repeater in Baie Verte, CKIM 1240 kHz.

On July 20, 2010, CKCM applied for an FM repeater which will rebroadcast CKCM in Springdale with the callsign CKCM-1-FM. This application received CRTC approval to operate at 89.3 MHz on September 15, 2010.

In September 2016, CKCM cancelled their remaining local programming and now simulcast CKGA in Gander full-time.

References

External links 
 VOCM
 
 
 
 

KCM
KCM
KCM